Hylotelephium telephium (synonym Sedum telephium), known as orpine, livelong, frog's-stomach, harping Johnny, life-everlasting, live-forever, midsummer-men, Orphan John and witch's moneybags, is a succulent perennial groundcover of the family Crassulaceae native to Eurasia. The flowers are held in dense heads and can be reddish or yellowish-white. A number of cultivars, often with purplish leaves, are grown in gardens as well as hybrids between this species and the related Hylotelephium spectabile (iceplant), especially the popular 'Herbstfreude' ('Autumn Joy'). Occasionally garden plants may escape and naturalise as has happened in parts of North America.

Taxonomy 
The plant was known to botanists, including Dioscorides (40 AD – 90 AD) in his De Materia Medica as Telephion. Pliny, Gerard and Parkinson were among many later authors to describe Telephium. It was first formally described by Linnaeus in 1753, as one of 15 species of Sedum, Gray included it and related species as a section of the genus Sedum. These species differ markedly from the rest of that genus by a  distinct ovary and ovules, flowering stems, leaves, inflorescence, flower parts, colour and blooming time and chromosome number. Consequently, Ohba (1977) segregated these species into a separate genus, Hylotelephium with 28 species, specifying Hylotelephium telephium as the type species. Subsequent molecular phylogenetic studies have confirmed that these species constitute a distinct clade, separate from the very large Sedum genus, which is paraphyletic. Sedum is widely considered to be an unnatural catch-all  taxonomic grouping. That clade, originally given the informal name Telephium and later Hylotelephium, was given the taxonomic rank of tribe Telephieae. The name Hylotelephium telephium has been widely, but not universally adopted.

Etymology and names

Telephium 
The name Telephium was thought to be named after a surgical term for an ulcer that was particularly difficult to cure. This in turn was named after King Telephus who suffered from a spear wound that would not heal (see Uses).

Common names 
Hylotelephium telephium has earned many common names in English, including orpine, livelong, life-everlasting, live-forever, frog's-stomach, harping Johnny, midsummer-men, orphan John and witch's moneybags.

Subdivision 
There are several subspecies. Ohba accepted the following:

Hylotelphium telephium subsp. fabaria Koch - West & Central Europe
Hylotelphium telephium subsp. maximum L. - Europe & W Asia
Hylotelphium telephium subsp. ruprechtii Jalas - North-east Europe
Hylotelphium telephium subsp. telephium - Central & East Europe, E Asia

Distribution and habitat 
The species is endemic from Europe to Asia, but has been widely introduced elsewhere, particularly N America. It can be found growing in fields, around hedges, hills, and on gravelly or calcareous soils. In the UK, it is found in woodland and near hedges.

Ecology 
In N America, where it has been introduced, Hylotelephium telephium is considered invasive.

Uses 
The very young leaves can be eaten raw, and both the young leaves and firm tubers can be cooked.

The plant has been used medicinally, being used by the Romans to treat wounds, and in later times to treat internal ulcers. It has also been used for love-divination. As the stems and leaves can store water, when picked. Hence common name livelong. They were hung in a room, where a girl was to be married to a boy. If the stems grew together, this 'sign' would mean that the marriage would be blessed and she would be happy. Alternatively, if they grew apart, the marriage prospects looked bad and if a stem died, this would portent death.

Gallery

Notes

References

Bibliography

Books 

 
 
 
 , in 
  (full text at ResearchGate)
 

Historical
 
  (from the Latin, after John Goodyer 1655])
  (Index in frontispiece)
 
 , see also Species Plantarum
 
 , see also English Botany

Articles

Websites 

 
 
 
 
 
 
 

Medicinal plants of Asia
Medicinal plants of Europe
Plants described in 1753
Taxa named by Carl Linnaeus
Groundcovers
telephium
Taxa named by Hideaki Ohba